James Iroha Uchechukwu  is a Nigerian photographer. He was born in 1972 in Enugu. He is known for his photography, his support to young photographers, and the passing on of his knowledge to the young. He is also regarded at the beginning of the 21st century as someone that has broadened the horizon of Nigerian photography.

Study and career 
Uchechukwu started to study sculpture in 1990 at the Art Academy of the University of Port Harcourt. He obtained his degree in 1996, and directly afterwards continued study in what is now his current profession, photography. In his work, Uchechukwu melts together the reproduction of common reality with the creative 'language' of the imagination, whereby he extends the possibilities of photography and is giving a new direction to local art.<ref name="Modern Tuareg-Uche">Diary of a Modern Tuareg (8 January 2009) [http://qudus.blogspot.com/2009/01/uche-james-iroha-gets-royal-award.html uche James-Iroha gets the Royal Award]</ref>

He is cofounder of Depth of Field (DOF), a collective of photographers, artist, and painters. He took the initiative to bring together six talented young photographers to form DOF. He organized several exhibitions of their work in Nigeria as well as abroad. He also teaches photography by giving seminars and workshops.African Centre for Cities, biography 

In 2004 Uchechukwu presented a series of award winning photo's on butcher's shops in the open air in Lagos, with the name Fire, Flesh and Blood. The photo series initially had a documentary character, but got the public's attentions as well because of its artistic mélange of colorful and smokey close-ups. The 2008 jury of the Prince Claus Fund describes the photo series as intense, cru, powerful and poetic.

In 2005 Uchechukwu received the Élan Price on the African Photography Encounters in Mali for his work Fire, Flesh and Blood. In 2008 he was honored with a Prince Claus Award from the Netherlands.

Personal life 
Uche is a Christian, he met and married his wife Chinwe in 2007.

Exhibitions 
Uchechukwu participated in several exhibitions. Here follows a selection:
2005: Depth of Field, South London Gallery, London
2005: Un autre monde/Another World: VI Rencontres Africaines de la Photographie, Maison Africaine de la Photographie & Centre de Cultura Contemporània, Bamako
2006: 1st Singapore Biennale, Singapore
2007: 2nd International Biennial of Contemporary Art of Seville (BIACS 2): The Unhomely: Phantom Scenes in Global Society, Centro Andaluz de Arte Contemporáneo, Seville
2007: Lens on Life: From Bamako to San Francisco, Museum of the African Diaspora, San Francisco
2008: Travesia, Centro Atlántico de Arte Moderno, Las Palmas de Gran Canaria
2008: Snap Judgments, by Okwui Enwezor, Stedelijk Museum, Amsterdam
2009: 8th Bamako Encounters, Biennial of African Photography-Borders, Bamako
2018: Contesting the Past exhibition, Institute of African Studies. University of Ibadan, Oyo State. 
2019: A quelle distance est le passé du présent?, LeCentre Benin

References 

Nigerian photographers
University of Port Harcourt alumni
Living people
1972 births
People from Enugu